Qaragöz or Karagëz may refer to:
 Qaragöz, Siazan, Azerbaijan
 Qaragöz, Zangilan, Azerbaijan